is a Paralympic swimmer from Japan competing mainly in category S4 events.

Akinobu competed in the 50m, 100m and 200m freestyle events at the 1996 Summer Paralympics.  He finished third in the 50m and 100m but failed to finish his heat in the 200m event.

References

External links
 

Year of birth missing (living people)
Living people
Japanese male freestyle swimmers
Paralympic swimmers of Japan
Paralympic medalists in swimming
Paralympic bronze medalists for Japan
Swimmers at the 1996 Summer Paralympics
Medalists at the 1996 Summer Paralympics
S4-classified Paralympic swimmers
20th-century Japanese people